

Ceratobia is a small genus of the fungus moth family, Tineidae. Therein, it belongs to the subfamily Tineinae.

Only five species are presently contained in this genus:
 Ceratobia adzharica Zagulajev, 1974
 Ceratobia hemiphracta 	(Meyrick, 1926) 
 Ceratobia irakella (Petersen, 1959)
 Ceratobia kintrishica Zagulajev, 1974
 Ceratobia oxymora (Meyrick, 1919)
 Ceratobia ratjadae Passerin, 1978 
 Ceratobia sudanica 	Gaedike, 2014

Footnotes

References
  [2011]: Global Taxonomic Database of Tineidae (Lepidoptera). Retrieved 2011-DEC-22.
De Prins, J. & De Prins, W. 2016. Afromoths, online database of Afrotropical moth species (Lepidoptera). World Wide Web electronic publication (www.afromoths.net) (acc.04-Mar-2017)

Tineinae